Willy Clever (1905 in Elberfeld –1969) was a German actor and screenwriter. He worked on several multi-language versions at the Joinville Studios in Paris during the early years of sound.

Selected filmography
 Spring Awakening (1929)
 Revolt in the Reformatory (1929)
 Witnesses Wanted (1930)
 The Man in the Dark (1930)
 Sunday of Life (1931)
 Every Woman Has Something (1931) 
 Student Life in Merry Springtime (1931)
 The Sandwich Girl (1933)
 Miracle of Flight (1935)
 Romance in a Minor Key (1943)
 Love Premiere (1943)
 A Heidelberg Romance (1951)

References

Bibliography
 Marc Silberman. German Cinema: Texts in Context. Wayne State University Press, 1995.

External links

1905 births
1969 deaths
20th-century German screenwriters
German male screenwriters
German male film actors
Actors from Wuppertal
Film people from North Rhine-Westphalia